Alexandra Cunningham Cameron is an American curator of contemporary design and the first Hintz Secretarial Scholar at Cooper Hewitt, Smithsonian Design Museum.

Career 
Cameron is currently the curator of contemporary design and inaugural Edward and Helen Hintz Secretarial Scholar at Cooper Hewitt, Smithsonian Design Museum.

Upon joining the museum in 2018, she initiated the critically acclaimed first retrospective of African-American fashion designer Willi Smith, edited the publication, Willi Smith: Street Couture (Rizzoli Electa, 2020) and developed the Willi Smith Digital Community Archive, a prototype for crowdsourced archiving, with website developers Cargo.

Cameron has curated architecture and design exhibitions at museums around the United States including Meeting the Clouds Halfway at the Museum of Contemporary Art Tucson, Free Play at Museum of Contemporary Art Santa Barbara, and Yona Friedman: Space Chain Phantasy at the Institute of Contemporary Art Miami. She has also organized large-scale and public works and performances with Ronan and Erwan Bouroullec, Philippe Malouin, Urs Fischer, Jamian Juliano-Villani, Dozie Kanu, Thom Browne, Fernando Laposse, Harvard Graduate School of Design Asif Khan, Charlap Hyman and Herrero, levenbetts, Aranda\Lasch Snarkitecture and Jamilah Sabur. She sits on the Executive Board of the Fondation D'entreprise Martell, established to present cross-disciplinary exhibitions and host residencies for artists, designers and chefs in Cognac, France.

In 2019, Cameron Co-curated with Gean Moreno the first public project of Yona Friedman in the United States. Friedman was 96 years old at the time. A Hungarian-born French architect, urban planner and designer, Friedman brought attention to informal architecture and the collaboration between professional architects and communities from the 1950s until his death in 2020. Much of his work derived from his experience as a refugee.

Cameron began her career with the Design Miami fairs in 2007. She stepped down as Creative Director in 2015. In 2011 she initiated a series of commissions at the fair with young US-based architects including Moorhead and Moorhead, Formlessfinder, Snarkitecture, and Jonathan Muecke.

From 2016-2018, Cameron was the editor in chief of The Miami Rail, an independent arts journal and sister paper of The Brooklyn Rail that produced critical coverage of art, architecture, politics, film and literature from the perspective of Miami as an axis of the United States, Caribbean and Latin America. While editing the paper, Cameron initiated a writers residency program for women writers including Alison Gingeras, Alissa Nutting, and Emily Raboteau. Cameron described the mission of the paper as critical. Criticism "is not a tool or a diversion. It is a fundamental, irreducible, absolute and essential approach to art and the world. Miami is not just a place. Miami is a crisis." The issues published under Cameron expanded the focus of the magazine, hiring Patricia Engel as literary editor.

Personal life 
Cameron was born on Miami Beach, Florida. She has workwed in both Miami and New York. She is married to the artist Seth Cameron, a founding member of the Bruce High Quality Foundation and Director of the Children's Museum of the Arts. They have two sons. Cameron’s career in the design field and collection of art and design, which includes the work of emerging and established designers and artists such as Philippe Malouin, Katie Stout, Maarten Baas, Max Lamb, Betty Tompkins, Ron Gorchov, Jim Brittingham and Nicola L. has been featured in publications such as The New York Times, Architectural Digests in the United States, Germany and Spain.

Selected exhibitions 

 Willi Smith: Street Couture, Cooper Hewitt, Smithsonian Design Museum, 2020
 Yona Friedman: Space Chain Phantasy, Institute of Contemporary Art, Miami, 2019
 Free Play, Museum of Contemporary Art, Santa Barbara, 2016
 Meeting the Clouds Halfway: Terrol Dew Johnson and Aranda\Lasch, Museum of Contemporary Art, Tucson, 2017

Selected public art, architecture, design and performance commissions 

 Dozie Kanu, Support System, 2018 
 Jamilah Sabur, Actual Infirnity, 2018 
 Charlap Hyman and Herrero, White Rain, 2017 
 Ronan and Erwan Bouroullec, Nuage, 2018
 Philippe Malouin, Speed of Light, 2016 
 Jonathan Muecke, Pavilion, 2014 
 Jamie Zigelbaum, Triangular Series, 2014 
 formlessfinder, TENT PILE, 2013 
 Judith Seng, Acting Things IV, 2013 
 Snarkitecture, Drift Pavilion, 2012

Publications 

 Willi Smith: Street Couture, Cunningham Cameron, Alexandra, ed., Cooper Hewitt, Smithsonian Design Museum and Rizzoli Electa, 2020.
Cunningham Cameron, Alexandra, An Ode to One of Streetwear’s Forgotten Founders, The Financial Times, March 6, 2020
The Miami Rail, “Issue 23,” Ed. Cunningham Cameron, Alexandra, Spring 2018  
The Miami Rail, “Issue 22,” Ed. Cunningham Cameron, Alexandra, Winter 2017  
The Miami Rail, “Issue 21,” Ed. Cunningham Cameron, Alexandra, Summer 2017  
The Miami Rail, “Issue 20,” Ed. Cunningham Cameron, Alexandra, Spring 2017

See also 

 Martine Syms
 Scott Burton
 Dozie Kanu

References 

American curators
American women curators
Smithsonian Institution people
Year of birth missing (living people)
Living people
People from Miami Beach, Florida
21st-century American non-fiction writers
21st-century American women writers